Iran–Venezuela relations (Spanish: Las relaciones de Irán y Venezuela; Persian:  روابط ایران و ونزوئلا) have strengthened substantially in recent years. "Iran and Venezuela are two friendly and united states which pave their ways to further progress and welfare for their nations", according to President Rouhani. The two countries are contemporary strategic allies of the Russian Federation and the People's Republic of China while opposing U.S. hegemony in their respective regions.

Country comparison

History

2001-2005: Chávez and Khatami administrations
As President of Venezuela from 1999, before his death, former Venezuelan president Hugo Chávez developed strong ties with the government of Iran, in particular in the area of energy production, economic, and industrial cooperation. The two countries have good cooperation in construction, oil and gas, and in infrastructure projects. He has visited Iran on several occasions, the first time in 2001, when he declared that he came to Iran to "prepare the road for peace, justice, stability and progress for the 21st century".  As the fifth President of Iran with a term lasting from 3 August 1997 to 3 August 2005, Mohamed Khatami visited Venezuela on three occasions. During his March 2005 visit, Chávez awarded him the Orden del Libertador and called him a "tireless fighter for all the right causes in the world."

In March 2005, the BBC reported that Chavez's relationship with Iran and his support of their nuclear program has created concern for the US administration.

2005-2006: Start of Ahmadinejad administration
Mahmoud Ahmadinejad was elected President of Iran on August 3, 2005. Since then, Ahmadinejad and Chávez visited each other multiple times, signing more than 270 bilateral deals to support multiple campaigns for social and infrastructural national development. Both presidents of Venezuela and Iran, President Hugo Chávez and President Ahmadinejad, respectively, have described themselves on the world stage as opposed to "US imperialism". Citing this commonality of opinion, they regard each other as allies, and they have embarked on a number of initiatives together. Chávez never scrimped in displays of support for Ahmadinejad's Iran and immediately recognized the legitimacy of his second term as president and supported Tehran's nuclear policy.

In early May 2006, it was reported that Venezuela was interested in selling its 21 F-16 Fighting Falcons to Iran, an announcement which proved controversial. Also in May 2006, Chávez expressed his favorable view of the production of nuclear energy in Iran announced by Mahmoud Ahmadinejad and denied that they had plans to develop atomic weapons.

In July 2006, Chávez paid a two-day visit to Iran when the government faced international criticism for continuing its nuclear program and backing Hezbollah guerrillas. In July 2006, Chávez pledged that Venezuela would "stay by Iran at any time and under any condition." He said 
"We are with you and with Iran forever. As long as we remain united we will be able to defeat imperialism, but if we are divided they will push us aside". In July 2006, Reuters reported that Chávez told a crowd at the University of Tehran, "If the U.S. succeeds in consolidating its dominance, then the humankind has no future. Therefore, we have to save the humankind and put an end to the U.S.".  The reports adds that Chávez lashed out at Israel and labeled the 2006 Lebanon offensive as "fascist and terrorist."

2007-2009: Axis of unity, "G-2 summit," and bank
On January 6, 2007, the two announced that they would use some money from a previously-announced $2bn joint fund to invest in other countries that were "attempting to liberate themselves from the imperialist yoke", in Chavez's words.

On March 16, 2007, Chavez said in a television interview that he disagreed with President Ahmadinejad's alleged call to "wipe Israel off the map" (which is a mistranslation) saying "I don't support causing harm to any nation.". (See also Israel-Venezuela relations.)

The two presidents declared an "axis of unity" against "US imperialism" in July 2007.

On October 5, 2008, Venezuela's Foreign Minister Nicolas Maduro visited Ahmadinejad in Tehran.

During the 2009 G-20 London summit, Chavez and Ahmadinejad held their own meeting which they called the "G-2" summit, at which the formation of a joint Iranian-Venezuelan development bank was announced, initially with US$200 million capital.

2010-2012: Bilateral visits
During a visit to Iran in 2010 by Hugo Chávez, he condemned "military attack threats against Iran by some countries. We know that they can never thwart the Islamic Revolution." He also said that as a result of such "great threats", it was necessary to "consolidate strategic alliances in political, economic, technological, energy and social areas." Mahmoud Ahmadinejad, also supported the comments for a "strategic alliance;" he also added that "We are united and determined to end the current unjust which dominates the world and replace it with a new world order based on justice. Iran and Venezuela are united to establish a new world order based on humanity and justice. We believe that the only result of bullying movements of imperialism all around the world, and especially in Latin America, will be the fast decline of imperial power." The two countries also signed deals in areas such as oil, natural gas, textiles, trade and public housing.

In May 2011, U.S. President Barack Obama imposed sanctions on Venezuela's state oil company PDVSA for defying US law and sending “Iran two tankers of an oil product.” In September 2011, Ahmadinejad postponed a visit to Caracas while Chavez recovered from a fourth round of cancer treatment, according to officials. Several days earlier, the two countries had “signed cooperation deals on manufacturing, energy, construction and agriculture during talks in Caracas.” Around this time, Maduro stated that ““While imperialism and its criminal elites have declared war on the Muslim people since more than 10 years ago, we in the Bolivarian Revolution, led by President Chavez, declare our love for the culture of Muslim people, all their history, and declare our eternal brotherhood.”

The object of Chávez's Bolivarianism was to create an ideological basin spreading from the Caribbean Sea to the Persian Gulf. It is a role that Iran is trying to carve out for itself amidst the undercurrents  engulfing his part of the world and the need to show that Iran is not isolated internationally.

2013: Death of Chavez
After Chávez's death was announced on March 5, 2013, vice president Nicolás Maduro became interim president. The day after Chavez's death, Ahmadinejad's personal tribute to Chavez online was met with criticism from some Iranian clerics, when he wrote that Chavez would “return on resurrection day” along with religious figures such as Jesus. A week later, CNN reported that Ahmadinejad attended the funeral of his “good friend” Chavez. Ahmadinejad embraced Chavez's grieving mother at the funeral in “a show of compassion and support,” which according to CNN in Iran “was immediately bashed by newspapers and by conservative politicians who cited a religious prohibition against touching a woman who is not your wife or a relative.” After the funeral, Ahmadinejad affirmed that Iran-Venezuelan relations would stay strong regardless of who was elected as the next Venezuelan president. At the time, as of March 10, 2013, "annual bilateral trade between the two countries is estimated to be in the hundreds of million of US dollars."

2013-2014: Maduro and Rouhani administrations
A special election was held on 14 April 2013 to elect a new president, and Nicolas Maduro won with 50.62% of the votes, and was inaugurated on 19 April.<ref name=sworn>"Nicolas Maduro sworn in as new Venezuelan president". BBC News. 19 April 2013. Retrieved 19 April 2013.</% of votess</ref> On April 19, 2013, Ahmadinejad arrived in Caracas to take part in Maduro's inauguration ceremony, stating “Venezuela is on the eve of a glorious way and has an important historic mission. The Venezuelan nation should at first progress rapidly to make a prosperous, advanced, rich, and powerful country. Secondly, it should keep the flag of justice and freedom raised in Latin America... [Iran's] relation with Venezuela...symbolizes Iran's relation with Latin America.” Hassan Rouhani was elected as President of Iran on 15 June 2013.

As of August 2014, Venezuela and Iran had “signed 265 agreements deriving from 58 projects in the industrial, environmental, agricultural, commercial, educational, sports, housing, cultural, energy and scientific and technology areas.” Early that month, Venezuelan Foreign Minister Elias Jaua visited Tehran to meet Rouhani in a purported effort to strengthen diplomatic relations, with Iran reaffirming its support for the Bolivarian government, and expressed mutual support of the Palestinian state, also agreeing to not recognize Israel as a legitimate state. Maduro visited Iran the next month.

2015-2016: Recent years

In January 2015, Maduro visited Iran, as a stop on his tour of other OPEC countries. Both Maduro and Rouhani agreed that falling oil prices resulted from increased fracking in the United States, as well as their “common enemies” using oil prices as a “political ploy.” Rouhani affirmed that Iran and Venezuela would join forces to “thwart world powers’ strategies ... and to stabilize prices at a reasonable level in 2015.” At the time, Venezuelan oil accounted for “over 95 percent of the country's export earnings,” with the price of a barrel dropping by half since 2014.

In June 2015, Iran and Venezuela signed a series of agreements to “fund joint investments and improve the supply of goods,” with Maduro announcing “These are six agreements of major importance for the economy of our countries.” The countries agreed to jointly fund a research program in nanotechnology, and Maduro also stated that he secured goods “necessary for the Venezuelan people” such as drugs and surgical equipment. Iran's Minister of Industry, Mines and Trade reportedly stated the agreement was preliminary subject to review by Iran's finance ministry.

On November 23, 2015, Maduro and Rouhani  met in Tehran in Maduro's second visit to the country that year, and the fifth from Venezuelan senior officials. During the meetings, the presidents announced they were re-affirming their country's mutual alliance.
 In January 2016, Maduro and Rouhani reportedly held telephone talks where "Maduro called on Rouhani to promote the adoption of measures to restore oil prices on the world market," with Maduro calling for a meeting of OPEC members to address the issue, and congratulating Rouhani on recent cancelations of sanctions.

2018-2019: Venezuelan presidential crisis
In May 2018, Maduro was re-elected for a second term, but the election was denounced as fraudulent by most neighboring countries, the European Union, Canada and the United States. Iran, however, recognized the election and President Rouhani congratulated Maduro.

In January 2019, the majority opposition National Assembly of Veneuzuela declared that Maduro's reelection was invalid and declared its president, Juan Guaidó, to be acting president of Venezuela. The United States, Canada, Brazil and several Latin American countries recognized Guaidó as interim president. Iran continued to support Maduro.

2020: Gasoline exports to Venezuela

In May 2020, Iran sent five oil tankers to Venezuela under sanctions of the U.S., because Venezuela's oil refining industry collapsed because of under investment and mismanagement. The names of the ships are Forest, Fortune, Petunia, Faxon and Clavel. These ships were loaded with gasoline at a refinery near Bandar Abbas. They carried about 60 million gallons of Iranian gasoline. Because of U.S. sanctions against both countries, Presidents of both countries warned about U.S. attempts to block this fuel delivery. After these threats to disrupt Iranian fuel tankers heading for Venezuela, Foreign Minister Mohammad Javad Zarif sent a letter to António Guterres to warn about the US move to send troops to the Caribbean to obstruct the fuel export. Also Abbas Araghchi summoned Swiss ambassador as protector of US interests in Iran, urging him to convey Iran's serious warning about any possible threats by the US against Iranian tankers.

2022: Iran's Naval base
As Israeli intelligence sources declared, Iran makes relations with Venezuela, and Iranian naval forces are planning to build a naval base at ports of Venezuela to operate out of in the Americas.

2023: Increased military presence and oil trade
Iran's petroleum exports hit a new high in early 2023 due to increased shipments to Venezuela and China. Iran had supported Venezuela's oil exports, and its navy established a presence in Panama Canal for the first time ever. The two countries also announced direct flights between Tehran and Caracas starting in August 2023.

Academic relations
The good cooperation between the two countries also expands in cultural and scientific fields in addition to the economic domains. At a time when Venezuela and Russia were working on nuclear cooperation, the Iranian Minister of Science, Research and Technology, Mohammad Mehdi Zahedi, headed a delegation to Caracas to hold talks with high-ranking officials in order to follow up on implementation of agreements which had been inked between the two countries in 2006. Additionally, two technical and educational committees for implementing Iran-Venezuela agreements were also set up. The Iranian delegation visited the Venezuelan Foundation for Seismological Research, Caracas Central University, Simon Bolivar University, and the Venezuelan Institute for Scientific Research. Beyond the political-military sphere the two countries also pledged to work together academically in the commissioning of a new university programme at the existing, tuition-free Bolivarian University, with a focus on teaching socialist principles and to promote discussion of "21st century socialism." The government of Venezuela said this followed with plans to establish the University of Civilizations under accords recently signed with Iran.

Trade relations
As of the end of 2008, Iran's beneficence to Venezuela had paid dividends in the form of an Iranian ammunition factory, a car assembly plant, a cement factory and even direct air service between Tehran, Damascus and Caracas courtesy of Iran Air, amongst others.

Trade between Venezuela and Iran has grown steadily and the two countries have launched joint ventures in a number of sectors, including energy, agriculture, housing, and infrastructure (2008). The value of industrial development projects carried out by Iranian firms in Venezuela stands at around $4 billion (December 2008).  Iran-Venezuela bilateral trade spiked, from less than $189,000 in 2001 to almost $57 million by the end of 2008.

In 2007, Iran Air, in partnership with Conviasa, started a Tehran-Caracas flight via Damascus. The flights along with the partnership between Conviasa and Iran Air ceased in 2010.

On March 10, 2013, the Times of Israel reported that "annual bilateral trade between the two countries is estimated to be in the hundreds of million of US dollars."

In mid-2020, the Iranian state-run corporation Etka, which, according to the Wall Street Journal, is owned by Iran's ministry of defense and has connections to the Revolutionary Guards, opened a supermarket in Caracas called "Megasis" mainly selling products imported from Iran.

On May 13, 2022, According to Iran's official news agency IRNA, a 110 million Euro contract has been signed to repair and restart Venezuela's smallest refinery, the 146,000-barrel-per-day El Palito.

On June 11, 2022, Iran and Venezuela signed a 20-year cooperation agreement in Tehran.

International reactions
A number of the relations between Iran and Venezuela have been controversial in other countries.

2006: Venezuela's F-16 fleet to Iran
In 2006, the Iranian media published series of reports that suggested Venezuela was interested to sell its 21 F-16 Fighting Falcons to Iran. The rumours were confirmed, when a Hugo Chavez advisor told the Associated Press that: "Venezuela's military is considering selling its fleet of U.S.-made F-16 fighter jets to another country, possibly Iran, in response to a U.S. ban on arms sales to President Hugo Chávez's government". In response, Sean McCormack, the U.S. State Department spokesman, warned Venezuela and suggested: "Without the written consent of the United States, Venezuela can't transfer these defense articles, and in this case F-16s, to a third country".

2012: U.S. Congress examines Iran in Latin America
In early 2012, the U.S. Congress began to voice escalating concern over Iran's interests in Latin America, particularly its relations with Venezuela. On January 18, Representative Jeff Duncan (R - South Carolina) introduced the Countering Iran in the Western Hemisphere Act of 2012. The bill called on the United States to use all elements of national power to counter Iran's growing presence and hostile activity in the Western Hemisphere. Then, on February 2, Representative Ileana Ros-Lehtinen (R-FL) convened a Committee on Foreign Affairs hearing on Iranian activity in the Western Hemisphere. Finally, on March 7, Duncan's legislation concerning the Iranian government's activities in the Western Hemisphere passed out of the House Foreign Affairs Committee with strong bipartisan support.

Following the hearings, a number of independent reports and position papers were released which appeared to legitimize the threat posed by Iranian activity in the Western Hemisphere. This included a major study by the Center for Strategic and International Studies in March 2012. However, it was also suggested that partisan politics contributed to Republicans' interest in the topic.

The Countering Iran in the Western Hemisphere Act of 2012 currently is before the House of Representatives for consideration. If passed into law by Congress, the bill will require the U.S. Secretary of State to submit to Congress a strategy to address Iran's growing presence and activity in the Western Hemisphere within 180 days of enactment.

See also

Foreign relations of Iran
Foreign relations of Venezuela

References

External links

 
Venezuela
Bilateral relations of Venezuela